Sylvia Vogl (born 15 December 1974) is an Austrian yacht racer who competed in the 2008 Summer Olympics.

References

1974 births
Living people
Austrian female sailors (sport)
Olympic sailors of Austria
Sailors at the 2008 Summer Olympics – 470
21st-century Austrian women